This is the complete list of Commonwealth Games medallists in men's athletics from 1930 to 2022. In 1970, most track events converted from races measured in yards to near-equivalents measured in metres. The list below treats these as separate events, but includes a link from the metric event to its previous imperial equivalent.

Current events

100 metres

Event distances at the Commonwealth Games became metric in 1970. For the equivalent pre-metric events see 100 yrds.

200 metres
Event distances at the Commonwealth Games became metric in 1970. For the equivalent pre-metric events see 220 yrds.

400 metres
Event distances at the Commonwealth Games became metric in 1970. For the equivalent pre-metric events see 440 yrds.

800 metres
Event distances at the Commonwealth Games became metric in 1970. For the equivalent pre-metric events see 880 yrds.

1500 metres
Event distances at the Commonwealth Games became metric in 1970. For the equivalent pre-metric events see the Mile.

5000 metres
Event distances at the Commonwealth Games became metric in 1970. For the equivalent pre-metric events see 3 miles.

10,000 metres
Event distances at the Commonwealth Games became metric in 1970. For the equivalent pre-metric events see 6 miles.

110 metres hurdles
Event distances at the Commonwealth Games became metric in 1970. For the equivalent pre-metric events see 120 yrds hurdles.

400 metres hurdles
Event distances at the Commonwealth Games became metric in 1970. For the equivalent pre-metric events see 440 yrds hurdles.

3000 metres steeplechase

4 x 100 metres relay
Event distances at the Commonwealth Games became metric in 1970. For the equivalent pre-metric events see 4 x 110 yrds relay.

4 x 400 metres relay

Marathon

10 km walk

High jump

Pole vault

Long jump

Triple jump

Shot put

Discus throw

Hammer throw

Javelin throw

Decathlon

Disability events

100 metres T12

100 metres T37

100 metres T46

200 metres T46

800m wheelchair

1500 metres T54

Marathon wheelchair

Shot put F32/34/52

Discus throw F42-44

Discus throw seated

Discontinued events

100 yards

220 yards

440 yards

880 yards

1 mile

3 mile

6 mile

120 yard hurdles

440 yard hurdles

20 km road walk

20 mile road walk

30 km road walk

50 km road walk

4 x 110 yards relay

4 x 440 yards relay

References
Results Database from the Commonwealth Games Federation

Athletics
Medalists

Commonwealth
Commonwealth Games medalists